The Gujarat Lions (often abbreviated as GL) was a franchise cricket team based in Rajkot, Gujarat, that competed in the Indian Premier League (IPL) in 2016 and 2017. The team was owned by Intex Technologies, who won the bid in 2016, after two teams were suspended following a spot-fixing scandal.

In total, 29 players have played for GL. Dinesh Karthik made the most appearances, appearing in all thirty matches played by the team. Suresh Raina has scored the most runs for GL, with 841 runs. No player has scored a century for GL, with the highest individual score being 84, scored by Raina. Dhawal Kulkarni has taken the most wickets for GL, with 21 wickets to his name. The best bowling figures belong to Andrew Tye, with 5/17.

The team has been captained by Raina for all of its matches except one, during which Brendon McCullum was the captain. Dinesh Karthik has been the only wicket keeper for GL, with 19 catches and 3 stumpings. Raina has taken the most catches as a fielder, with 11 catches.

The first list includes all players who have played in at least one match for GL and is initially listed alphabetically by their last name. The second list comprises all those players who have captained the team in at least one match, arranged in the order of the first match as captain. Many players have also represented other teams of the IPL, but only the records of their games for GL are given.

Key

Players

Captains

See also 

 List of Indian Premier League centuries
List of Indian Premier League records and statistics

Notes

Footnotes

References 

Lists of Indian Premier League cricketers